Knyazhnin or Kniazhnin is a Russian masculine surname, its feminine counterpart is Knyazhnina or Kniazhnina. It may refer to
Ekaterina Kniazhnina (1746–1797), Russian poet
Yakov Knyazhnin (1742–1791), Russian author, husband of Ekaterina

Russian-language surnames